The Church of St George is a Greek Orthodox Church situated in Valletta, Malta. It is one of the orthodox churches in Malta.

Origins 
The church was founded 1816 by Greeks living in Malta.  The church falls under the jurisdiction of the Ecumenical Patriarch of Constantinople. The certificates of baptisms, marriages and deaths that took place at this church are located at the Mdina Cathedral museum archives.

See also

Culture of Malta
History of Malta
List of Churches in Malta
Religion in Malta

References

Buildings and structures in Valletta
Eastern Christianity in Malta
Churches completed in 1816
1816 establishments in Malta
Greek Orthodox churches
Eastern Orthodox church buildings in Malta